Simón Rodríguez Municipality is one of the twenty-nine municipalities that composes the Táchira state in the Andes of Venezuela. Its capital is San Simón town. It has an extension of 69 km2, according to estimations of National Institute of Statistic of Venezuela (NSI) its population for the year 2007 is of 3,000 inhabitants.

History 

Its foundation dates from the year 1870 as the Valley of the Yeguines and Buruquias and was created as an autonomous municipality in the year of 1995.

Political and territorial division 

Simón Rodríguez municipality have one parish denominated San Simón.

Limits 

Limits to the north with the municipality of Samuel Darío Maldonado, to the south with Merida state, to the east with the Merida state and to the west with the municipality of Jáuregui.

References 

Municipalities of Táchira